Jean Guéguinou (17 October 1941 – 21 June 2021) was a French diplomat, who served as ambassador to Czechoslovakia (1990–1993), the United Kingdom (1993–1998), and the Vatican City (1993–1998). Guéguinou also served as Consul-General in Jerusalem from 1982 to 1986 and as France's permanent representative to UNESCO from 2000 to 2006.

Early life 
Jean Guéguinou was born on 17 October 1941 in Carhaix-Plouguer, Brittany, France.

Diplomatic career

Death
Guéguinou died on 21 June 2021 at the age of 79.

References

External links 

1941 births
2021 deaths
20th-century French diplomats
Ambassadors of France to the United Kingdom
Ambassadors of France to Czechoslovakia
People from Finistère
Permanent Representatives of France to the United Nations
Ambassadors of France to the Holy See
Knights of the Holy Sepulchre